The Alba-Golden Independent School District is a school district serving southeastern Rains and western Wood counties in eastern Texas (USA). The district serves the towns of Alba and Golden. It is a AA school. Its mascot is the panther.

Finances
As of the 2010–2011 school year, the appraised valuation of property in the district was $234,719,000. The maintenance tax rate was $0.104 and the bond tax rate was $0.004 per $100 of appraised valuation.

Academic achievement
In 2011, the school district was rated "recognized" by the Texas Education Agency.  Thirty-five percent of districts in Texas in 2011 received the same rating. No state accountability ratings will be given to districts in 2012. A school district in Texas can receive one of four possible rankings from the Texas Education Agency: Exemplary (the highest possible ranking), Recognized, Academically Acceptable, and Academically Unacceptable (the lowest possible ranking).

Historical district TEA accountability ratings
2011: Recognized
2010: Academically Acceptable
2009: Recognized
2008: Academically Acceptable
2007: Recognized
2006: Recognized
2005: Academically Acceptable
2004: Recognized

Campuses
In the 2011–2012 school year, the district had students in three schools.
Regular instructional
 Alba-Golden High School (Grades 6–12)
 Alba-Golden Elementary School (Grades PK-5)
DAEP instructional
Alternative School (Grades 7–12)

See also

List of school districts in Texas
List of high schools in Texas

References

External links
Alba-Golden Independent School District

School districts in Wood County, Texas
School districts in Rains County, Texas